One of Many is the second album by London-based music producer Eric Lau. Okayplayer claimed that "Eric may be one of many, but his lone light shines brightly on his sophomore effort."

Track listing

Personnel 

 Alex Bonfanti - Acoustic Guitar, Bass
 Annabel - Background Vocals
 Ben Jones - Electric Guitar, Drums
 Eric Lau – Production, Mixing 
 Fatima - Vocals
 Georgia Anne Muldrow - Vocals
 Kaidi Tatham - Bass, CP-70, Flute, Hi-Hats, Juno 106, Matrix 1000, Moog, Minimoog, Piano, Prophet 5, Rhodes, Solina
 Meshach Brown - Background Vocals
 Oddisee - Vocals
 Olivier St. Louis - Vocals 
 Rahel Debebe-Dessalegne - Vocals
 Sarina Leah - Background Vocals
 Tawiah - Vocals
 Tim Debney - Mastering

References

2013 albums
Eric Lau albums